Çardaqlar or Chardakhlar or Chardakhlo may refer to:
Aşağı Çardaqlar, Azerbaijan
Yuxarı Çardaqlar, Azerbaijan

See also
Çardaqlı (disambiguation)